Kwanza is the currency of Angola.

Kwanza or the same pronunciation may refer to:

Cuanza River
Kwanzaa, an annual late December holiday week 
Kwanza (The First), album
 Kwanza (album) by Archie Shepp
Kwanza, Angola
Kwanza, Kenya